The Carnegie Museum of Art is an art museum in the Oakland neighborhood of Pittsburgh, Pennsylvania. Originally known as the Department of Fine Arts, Carnegie Institute and was at what is now the Main Branch of the Carnegie Library of Pittsburgh. The museum's first gallery was opened for public use on November 5, 1895. Over the years the gallery vastly increased in size, with new a new building on Forbes Avenue in 1907. In 1963, the name was officially changed to Museum of Art, Carnegie Institute. The size of the gallery has tripled over time, and it was officially renamed in 1986 to "Carnegie Museum of Art" to clearly indicate it as one of the four Carnegie Museums.

History 
The museum's origins can be traced to 1886, with Andrew Carnegie's initial concept: "I am thinking of incorporating with the plan for a library that of an art-gallery in which shall be preserved a record of the progress and development of pictorial art in America." Dedicated on November 5, 1895, the art gallery was initially housed in the Carnegie Library of Pittsburgh's Main Branch in Oakland.

Carnegie envisioned a museum collection consisting of the "Old Masters of tomorrow". The museum received a major expansion in 1907 with the addition of the Hall of Architecture, Hall of Sculpture, and Bruce Galleries, with funds again provided by Carnegie.

Under the directorship of Leon A. Arkus, the Sarah Mellon Scaife Gallery (125,000 square feet) was built as an addition to the existing Carnegie Institute. Designed by architect Edward Larrabee Barnes, it first opened in 1974 and more than doubled the museum's exhibition space, plus added a children's studio, theater, offices, café, and bookstore. The New York Times art critic John Russell described the gallery as an "unflawed paradise." The gallery has been renovated several times since its original creation, most recently in 2004.

Today the museum continues Carnegie's love of contemporary art by staging the Carnegie International every few years. Numerous significant works from the Internationals have been acquired for museum's permanent collection including Winslow Homer's The Wreck (1896) and James A. McNeill Whistler's Arrangement in Black: Portrait of Señor Pablo de Sarasate (1884).

Collections and departments 

The museum's curatorial departments include: Fine Arts (Contemporary Art, Works on Paper), Decorative Arts, Architecture, and Photography. The museum presents as many as 15 changing exhibitions annually. Its permanent collection comprises roughly 35,000 works and includes European and American decorative arts from the late seventeenth century to the present, works on paper, paintings, prints (notably Japanese prints), sculptures and installations. The museum has notably strong collections of both aluminum relics and chairs. Approximately 1,800 works are on view at any given time.

The museum also maintains a large archive of negatives from African-American photographer Charles "Teenie" Harris.

Heinz Architectural Center - The collection includes works in architecture, landscape design, engineering, and furniture and interior design. The center's facilities includes 4,000 square feet of exhibition space and a library housing several thousand books and journals.

The Hillman Photography Initiative - The Initiative hosts a variety of projects including live public events, web-based projects, documentary videos, art projects, and writing. Yearly programming is determine by a group of five "agents" who plan and curate each 12-month cycle of works hosted.

Collection Themes
 Contemporary Glass
 Teenie Harris Photographs: Erroll Garner and Jazz from the Hill
 Carnegie International
 Japanese Prints
 Pittsburgh Artists
 The Art of the Chair
 Pictorialist Photography
 Painting and Sculpture 1860–1920
 W. Eugene Smith

Galleries

 Ailsa Mellon Bruce Galleries (1907) – The Ailsa Mellon Bruce Galleries were originally constructed to display reproduction bronze casts from Pompeii and Herculaneum. The gallery was renovated in 2009, and currently exhibits more than 500 objects representing American and European decorative arts from the Rococo and Neoclassical periods of the 18th century to contemporary design and craft.
 Hall of Architecture (1907) – The Hall of Architecture houses almost 140 full-size plaster casts of elements of buildings found in the ancient and classical civilizations of Egypt, Greece and Rome, and from Romanesque, Gothic and Renaissance Europe. It is the largest collection of plaster casts of architectural masterpieces in America and one of the three largest in the world, along with those of the Victoria and Albert Museum in London and the Musée national des Monuments Français in Paris.
 Hall of Sculpture (1907) – The Hall of Sculpture was modeled after the Parthenon's inner sanctuary, and was originally created to house the museum's 69 plaster casts of Egyptian, Near Eastern, Greek, and Roman sculpture. Today it exhibits works from the permanent collections, with its balcony displaying decorative arts objects from the eighteenth to the twentieth century.
 Heinz Architectural Center (1993) – dedicated to the collection, study, and exhibition of architectural drawings and models.
 Scaife Galleries (1974) – The Scaife Galleries display the permanent collection of the museum, and contains paintings, sculptures, works on paper, film, and video pieces.
 Forum Gallery – Located on the first floor of the museum just inside the Forbes Avenue entrance, this single room is dedicated to temporary exhibitions of contemporary art. It opened November 3, 1990 with support from the National Endowment of the Arts – The first exhibition, Forum 1, was a solo show of Jeff Wall. Subsequent exhibitions were numbered sequentially (for example, Forum 40 featured Felix de la Concha). Unlike larger museum exhibitions, which can take up to three years to plan and execute, Forum shows come together relatively quickly, and are open to any curatorial staff's vision. In the words of Vicky Clark, a longtime curator at the museum, "The idea was to make sure that we had an exhibition of contemporary art set up at all times."

Educational programs 
Saturday art classes in the galleries of Carnegie Museum of Art have been conducted for over 75 years. Alumni of the program include Andy Warhol, photographer Duane Michals, and contemporary artist Philip Pearlstein.  The museum has classes specific to various age groups.

Gallery

Past directors 

 John W. Beaty (1896–1921)
 Homer Saint-Gaudens (1922–1950)
 Gordon Bailey Washburn (1950–1962)
 Gustave Von Groschwitz (1963–1968)
 Leon Arkus (1968–1980)
 John R. Lane (1980–1987)
 Phillip M. Johnston (1988–1996)
 Richard Armstrong (1996–2008)
 Lynn Zelevansky (2009–2017)
 Eric Crosby (2018–present)

See also 
 Carnegie Museums of Pittsburgh
 Homer Saint-Gaudens
 Frick Art & Historical Center
 List of museums in Pennsylvania
 Sally Dixon

References

External links 
 
 Carnegie Museums
 A finding aid to the Carnegie Institute, Museum of Art records, 1883-1962, bulk 1885-1940, in the Archives of American Art, Smithsonian Institution
 
 

 
1896 establishments in Pennsylvania
Andrew Carnegie
Art museums established in 1896
Art museums and galleries in Pennsylvania
Asian art museums in the United States
Edward Larrabee Barnes buildings
Institutions accredited by the American Alliance of Museums
Modern art museums in the United States
Museums in Pittsburgh
Plaster cast collections
Tourist attractions in Pittsburgh